Say Goodbye is a 1989 studio album by Shirley Kwan.

Track listing

Shirley Kwan albums
1989 albums